Ars Combinatoria, a Canadian Journal of Combinatorics is  an English language research journal in combinatorics, published by the Charles Babbage Research Centre, Winnipeg, Manitoba, Canada. From 1976 to 1988 it published two volumes per year, and subsequently it published as many as six volumes per year.

The journal is indexed in MathSciNet and Zentralblatt. As of 2019, SCImago Journal Rank listed it in the bottom quartile of miscellaneous mathematics journals.

As of December 15, 2021, the editorial board of the journal resigned, asking that inquiries be directed to the publisher.

References

1976 establishments in Canada
Publications established in 1976
Academic journals published in Canada
English-language journals
Quarterly journals
Combinatorics journals
Mass media in Winnipeg